John O'Shea (born 1944) is founder and former CEO of GOAL, an Irish non-governmental organization devoted to assisting the poorest of the poor. His first career was as a sports journalist and GOAL retains significant links to the sporting community, especially in Ireland.

O'Shea was shortlisted in the top 40 of 2010 RTÉ poll to find Ireland's Greatest person.

Early life and career
O'Shea was born in County Limerick in 1944 and lived in Westport and in Cork. His father, a banker, moved the family to Dublin when he was age 11. He was schooled in CBC Monkstown and was a sports fanatic playing rugby at school and a keen golfer and tennis player in Monkstown. O'Shea remains a keen fan of rugby, tennis and golf, playing tennis every Saturday and also giving opinions on Irish sports to radio and newspapers. O'Shea went on to study Economics, English and Philosophy at University College Dublin and had a career as a sports journalist in the Evening Press for many years after meeting Tim Pat Coogan whilst studying.

GOAL
In 1977, he began his charitable organisation with a 10,000 punts donation for a feeding project in Calcutta after which O'Shea founded GOAL. The charity has a major sporting backbone. John McEnroe, Pat Cash and Gordon D'Arcy are amongst the sportstars to have become "Goalies"(volunteers).

In its 36 years of operation, GOAL has distributed €790 million and has had over 1,400 volunteers. It has operated in over 50 countries worldwide. O'Shea cites watching the "Goalies" working around the world as the best part of his years involved in the charity. O'Shea believes that governments of developed countries should be far more involved in the distribution of aid. Speaking on a tribute to his work in GOAL in 2007 on Ireland foremost chat show-The Late Late Show, O'Shea said;

In 2012, O'Shea was asked to slow down by his doctor. In November 2012, former Fianna Fáil politician, Barry Andrews, was appointed chief executive of GOAL.

Controversies
A sometimes controversial figure, O'Shea is known for his forthright public statements, particularly when he feels political correctness is getting in the way of assisting those in need, and a hands on approach to tackling poverty related issues.
He has been criticised by some in the INGO community for advocating military invasion and intervention in Sudan by the US, UK and NATO, under the guise of humanitarian intervention. He has also been critical of perceived inaction by the UN in humanitarian crisis' in conflict zones and of governmental aid agencies in giving aid directly to allegedly corrupt African governments. John O'Shea has advocated using private companies to provide aid and military forces to directly force aid on countries. Most other Irish Aid agencies disagree stating that every type of aid channels must be used and have described his policies as re-colonisation.

His stance has drawn praise with the Vice Chancellor of the Open University which awarded him an honorary doctorate, John Naughton stating; "“He [John O’Shea] says openly that Western aid ought not to be channelled to governments that are proven to be either corrupt or brutal – and he is happy to name those regimes. Plain speaking of this order is not usually a way to win friends and influence people. But it has influenced us, which is why we honour him today."

Additionally his salary has garnered criticisms in some quarters.

Awards
O'Shea's list of achievements and awards include: the People of the Year Awards 1987 and 1992, The Ballygowan Outstanding Achievement Award 1988, MIR Award 1992, The Late Late Show Tribute 1995 and 2007, Texaco Outstanding Achievement Award 1995 and the Tipperary International Peace Award 2003, Ernst & Young Social Entrepreneur of the Year 2005.

In 2008, he was conferred with an honorary doctorate of laws from the University of Notre Dame in recognition of his work.

Current Work/Life
John O'Shea currently gives talks at NUI Galway and interpersonal skills class UCD. He has become involved with the university for a few years where he shares his story. He is an advocate for social (non-profit) entrepreneurs and tries to convince students to go down that path.

Remuneration
The Sunday Independent newspaper reported in 2010 that he drew a then annual salary of €98,320 as acting CEO of GOAL.

Notes and references

External links
 GOAL Official website
 GOAL USA
 Thoughts for the day by John O'Shea 

Living people
1944 births
20th-century Irish people
21st-century Irish people
Alumni of University College Dublin
Irish humanitarians
Irish sports journalists
People educated at C.B.C. Monkstown
The Irish Press people
University of Notre Dame people